Israel Sabdi Jiménez Nañez (born 13 August 1989) is a Mexican professional footballer who plays as a defender for the Monterrey Flash of the Major Arena Soccer League. In traditional outdoor soccer, Jiménez primarily operated as a right-back. He is an Olympic gold medalist.

Club career

Tigres UANL
On 26 July 2008, Israel Jiménez debuted in the Primera Division in the first game of the Apertura 2008, in a draw 0–0 against Pachuca under the manager, Manuel Lapuente.

His first international game with Tigres UANL was in the 2009 North American SuperLiga in a game against Chivas USA, he played for the entire game.

Since Ricardo Ferretti became the team's coach, Jiménez is a regular starter. He was part of the Apertura 2011 and Apertura 2015 championship-winning team's starting line-up.

Monterrey Flash
In June 2022, Jiménez signed with the Monterrey Flash of the Major Arena Soccer League.

International career

Mexico U-23
In 2012 Jimenez was chosen by coach Luis Fernando Tena to be on the Mexico national team at the 2012 Olympic Qualifying Tournament held in the United States. Jimenez scored in his debut in the tournament from a long range free kick against Trinidad and Tobago. Mexico went on to win the tournament and qualify to the London 2012 Summer Olympics. Jimenez made the final cut for those participating in the Olympics. Jimenez won gold team medal for Mexico after defeating Brazil in the final.

Mexico national team
On 23 May 2011, Jiménez received an opportunity to play the 2011 Copa America and was called up to the Mexico U-22 national football team preliminary squad. however he did not make the final cut for those participating in the tournament. Jimenez made his full senior debut with Mexico 25 January 2012 in a friendly game against Venezuela, the game resulted in a 3–1 win for Mexico. Jimenez was a squad member at the 2013 CONCACAF Gold Cup.

Career statistics

International

Honours
Tigres UANL
Liga MX: Apertura 2011, Apertura 2015, Apertura 2016, Apertura 2017, Clausura 2019
Copa MX: Clausura 2014
Campeón de Campeones: 2016, 2017, 2018
SuperLiga: 2009
Campeones Cup: 2018

Mexico U23
CONCACAF Olympic Qualifying Championship: 2012
Olympic Gold Medal: 2012

Mexico
CONCACAF Cup: 2015

Notes

References

External links
 
 
 
 
 

1989 births
Living people
Footballers from Nuevo León
Association football defenders
Olympic footballers of Mexico
Footballers at the 2012 Summer Olympics
Olympic gold medalists for Mexico
Olympic medalists in football
Tigres UANL footballers
Club Tijuana footballers
FC Juárez footballers
Mazatlán F.C. footballers
Monterrey Flash players
Liga MX players
Medalists at the 2012 Summer Olympics
Mexico international footballers
2013 CONCACAF Gold Cup players
Sportspeople from Monterrey
Mexican footballers